Fiona Hill (born October 1965) is a British-American foreign affairs specialist and author. She is a former official at the U.S. National Security Council, specializing in Russian and European affairs. She was a witness in the November 2019 House hearings regarding the impeachment inquiry during the first impeachment of Donald Trump. She earned a Ph.D. in history from Harvard University in 1998. She currently serves as a Senior Fellow at the Brookings Institution in Washington. She will take up office as Chancellor of Durham University in England in summer 2023.

Early life and education 
Hill was born in Bishop Auckland, County Durham, in North East England, in 1965, the daughter of a coal miner, Alfred Hill, and a midwife, June Murray. Her father died in 2012; her mother still lives in Bishop Auckland. In the 1960s, as many of the local coal mines were closing, her father wanted to emigrate to find work in the mines of Pennsylvania or West Virginia, but his mother's poor health required him to stay in England. He subsequently worked as a porter in a hospital. 

Her family struggled financially. June sewed clothes for her daughters and at the age of 13, Fiona began working at odd jobs, including washing cars and working as a waitress at a local hotel.

She and her sister attended Bishop Barrington School, a local comprehensive school. In 2017, she recalled applying for the University of Oxford: "I applied to Oxford in the '80s and was invited to an interview. It was like a scene from Billy Elliot: people were making fun of me for my accent and the way I was dressed. It was the most embarrassing, awful experience I had ever had in my life." She then read history and studied Russian at the University of St. Andrews in Scotland. She has revealed that the manager of the Royal and Ancient Golf Club threatened to blacklist her when she reported being sexually assaulted while waitressing during her student days in St Andrews.

In 1987, she was an exchange student in the Soviet Union, where, while interning for NBC News, she witnessed the signing of the Intermediate-Range Nuclear Forces Treaty by Ronald Reagan and Mikhail Gorbachev. An American professor encouraged Hill to apply for a graduate program in the United States. On the experience, in 2003, Hill wrote in The Siberian Curse: "I noticed that many aspects of British (and, by relation, American) culture were surprisingly, even unexpectedly similar, and that the Russians and the West had a good deal in common. Before long, other aspects of the Soviet and Russian [...] mentalities and cultures reared their heads, and these gaps seemed larger and more consuming than any novel or textbook could transmit". Continuing in another passage, she writes: "Whether or not these gaps can be effectively bridged or, at least, mitigated will remain the guiding question for this field of study for decades to come." Hill seemed to answer this question for herself in 2020, when she co-wrote an op-ed in Politico Magazine, along with Jon Huntsman Jr., Robert Legvold, Rose Gottemoeller, and Thomas R. Pickering, wherein they state that, although Russia is and will likely remain greatly disharmonious with Western Europe and North America, it is in the security interests of the United States to seek cooperation where possible.

At Harvard University, she earned a master's degree in Russian and modern history in 1991, and a Ph.D. in history in 1998 under Richard Pipes, Akira Iriye, and Roman Szporluk. While at Harvard, Hill was a Frank Knox Fellow. Her doctoral thesis was In search of great Russia: elites, ideas, power, the state, and the pre-revolutionary past in the new Russia, 1991–1996.

Career

Early career 
From 1991 to 1999, Hill worked in the research department at the John F. Kennedy School of Government at Harvard University. In 1992, she served as coordinator for a Trilateral Study on Japanese-Russian-U.S. Relations" there and, from 1993 to 1994, she was director of the Ethnic Conflict Project. 

In 1999, Hill was associate director of Harvard University's Strengthening Democratic Institutions project. She served as director of Strategic Planning for the Eurasia Foundation from 1999 to 2000.

Government service 
Hill was an intelligence analyst under Presidents George W. Bush and Barack Obama from 2006 to 2009. At the National Intelligence Council as a national intelligence analyst of Russia and Eurasia from 2006 to 2009.

Hill is a member of the Council on Foreign Relations and the board of trustees of the Eurasia Foundation.

Trump administration (2017–2019)
In 2017, she took a leave of absence from the Brookings Institution, where she was director for the Center on the United States and Europe, while also on the National Security Council.

Hill was appointed, in the first quarter of 2017, by President Donald Trump as deputy assistant to the president and senior director for European and Russian affairs on his National Security Council staff.

Hill had been due to leave the White House to return to Brookings in April 2019. She developed a close working relationship with National Security Advisor John Bolton, and at Bolton's request, Hill agreed to stay on until mid-July, after which Tim Morrison would replace her. As planned, Hill left the White House on July 15, ten days before the Trump–Zelenskyy telephone call.

Subsequently, Hill has spoken of the difficulty of maintaining a consistent U.S.-Russia policy under President Trump, a result of the clash of her "hawkish" view on Russia and Trump's intermittently warm and welcoming approach, and of the difficulty of ascertaining what Trump and Putin discussed in private meetings.

Post-Trump
In her post-White House career, Hill returned to academic work. Her views on Russia could be characterized by increasing pessimism on cooperation with the United States, as she expresses fear that even Russia's foremost oppositional politician, Alexei Navalny, employs populism and has a history of engaging nationalism. Hill believes that, in the context of Russia's resurgent international adventurism, Navalny's political potential does not augur well with the United States' national security interests.

Among many analysts sought for their assessment of the January 6, 2021 assault on the capitol, Hill stated to The Daily Beast, "The president was trying to stage a coup. There was little chance of it happening, but there was enough chance that the former defense secretaries had to put out that letter, which was the final nail through that effort. They prevented the military from being involved in any coup attempt. But instead, Trump tried to incite it himself, [t]his could have turned into a full-blown coup had he had any of those key institutions following him. Just because it failed or didn't succeed doesn't mean it wasn't real." On January 11, 2021, an opinion authored by Hill explicated the basis for her assessment of the attempted coup that precipitated the second impeachment of Donald Trump.

October 2021 saw the release of Hill's book There Is Nothing for You Here: Finding Opportunity in the 21st Century, published by Houghton Mifflin Harcourt. NPR described the book as "part memoir, part history tome, and part policy prescription".

In an October 2021 interview, while recounting her tenure at the White House, Hill drew several parallels between Trump and Putin, noting that both leaders had displayed a penchant for personal power, public performance, and used public nostalgia to gain support. Trump for his part described her as "a deep state stiff with a nice accent".

During an interview by The New York Times on April 11, 2022, Hill was asked about the motivation for the January 6 rally and provoking the assault on the capitol. She responded that it was "Trump pulling a Putin" in that he was attempting to remain in office similarly to Putin's having extended his term, because of Trump's yearning "to stay in power like the strongmen he admired".

It was announced in November 2022 that she had been appointed as the next Chancellor of Durham University in succession to Sir Thomas Allen, to take office in summer 2023.

Controversies

Steele dossier
At the Brookings Institution, Hill worked closely with Igor Danchenko. In 2010, Danchenko, Hill and Erica Downs co-authored a paper called "One Step Forward, Two Steps Back? The Realities of a Rising China and Implications for Russia’s Energy Ambitions". Hill introduced Danchenko to Christopher Steele and to U.S.-based public-relations executive Charles Dolan Jr., who would later become one of Danchenko's sources for the Steele dossier.

Impeachment inquiry testimony 

On October 14, 2019, responding to a subpoena, Hill testified in a closed-door deposition for ten hours before a committee of the United States Congress as part of the impeachment inquiry against President Donald Trump during his first impeachment. Some Republicans questioned the credibility of her testimony, including Connie Mack IV, who described Hill as a "George Soros mole infiltrating the national-security apparatus".

She testified in public before the same body on November 21, 2019. While being questioned by Steve Castor, the counsel for the House Intelligence Committee's Republican minority, Hill commented on Gordon Sondland's involvement in the Ukraine matter: "It struck me when (Wednesday), when you put up on the screen Ambassador Sondland's emails, and who was on these emails, and he said these are the people who need to know, that he was absolutely right," she said. "Because he was being involved in a domestic political errand, and we were being involved in national security foreign policy. And those two things had just diverged." 

In response to a question from that committee's chairman, Rep. Adam Schiff, Hill stated: "The Russians' interests are frankly to delegitimize our entire presidency... The goal of the Russians [in 2016] was really to put whoever became the president — by trying to tip their hands on one side of the scale — under a cloud."

2022 Russian invasion of Ukraine 
On February 28, 2022, during the Russian invasion of Ukraine, Hill was asked by Politico'''s senior editor Maura Reynolds if she thought Vladimir Putin would use Russia's nuclear weapons and responded by saying, "Putin is increasingly operating emotionally and likely to use all the weapons at his disposal, including nuclear ones." She stated, "Every time you think, 'No, [Putin] wouldn't, would he?' Well, yes, he would." Hill also stated that she believes that World War III is in progress and that the invasion of Ukraine exemplifies that. In a later interview with Politico, Hill said the war is the third great power conflict in Europe in a little over a century, saying "it's the end of the existing world order. Our world is not going to be the same as it was before."

 Personal life 
As a student at Harvard, Hill met her future husband, Kenneth Keen, at Cabot House. They have a daughter. Hill became a U.S. citizen in 2002.

 Selected works 
Hill's books include:

 See also 
Trump–Ukraine scandal
Second impeachment of Donald Trump

 References 

 External links 

 Hill articles at The Globalist''

1965 births
Alumni of the University of St Andrews
American historians
21st-century American historians
Harvard University alumni
Brookings Institution people
George W. Bush administration personnel
Obama administration personnel
Trump administration personnel
Living people
British emigrants to the United States
People with acquired American citizenship
Chancellors of Durham University